Deben (Debeen) is a rural locality (a selo) in Bichursky District, Republic of Buryatia, Russia. The population was 54 as of 2010. There is 1 street.

Geography 
Deben is located 52 km west of Bichura (the district's administrative centre) by road. Podgornoye is the nearest rural locality.

References 

Rural localities in Bichursky District